Rogaland is a county in Western Norway, bordering the North Sea to the west and the counties of Vestland to the north, Vestfold og Telemark to the east and Agder to the east and southeast. In 2020, it had a population of 479,892. The administrative centre of the county is the city of Stavanger, which is one of the largest cities in Norway.

Rogaland is the centre of the Norwegian petroleum industry. In 2016, Rogaland had an unemployment rate of 4.9%, one of the highest in Norway. In 2015, Rogaland had a fertility rate of 1.78 children per woman, which is the highest in the country. The Diocese of Stavanger for the Church of Norway includes all of Rogaland county.

Etymology 
Rogaland is the region's Old Norse name, which was revived in modern times.  During Denmark's rule of Norway until the year 1814, the county was named Stavanger amt, after the large city of Stavanger.  The first element is the plural genitive case of rygir which is probably referring to the name of an old Germanic tribe (see Rugians). The last element is land which means "land" or "region". In Old Norse times, the region was called Rygjafylki.

Coat of arms 
The coat of arms is modern; it was granted on 11 January 1974. The arms are blue with a white or silver pointed cross in the centre.  The cross is based on the old stone cross in Sola, the oldest national monument in Norway.  It was erected in memory of Erling Skjalgsson after his death in 1028.  This type of cross was very common in medieval Norway.

Geography 
Rogaland is mainly a coastal region with fjords, beaches, and islands, the principal island being Karmøy. The vast Boknafjorden is the largest bay, with many fjords branching off from it.

Stavanger/Sandnes, the third-largest urban area of Norway, is in central Rogaland and it includes the large city of Stavanger and the neighboring municipalities of Sandnes, Randaberg, and Sola.  Together, this conurbation is ranked above the city Trondheim in population rankings in Norway.

There are many cities/towns in Rogaland other than Stavanger and Sandnes. They include Haugesund, Egersund, Sauda, Jørpeland, Bryne, Kopervik, Åkrehamn, and Skudeneshavn.

Karmøy has large deposits of copper (some from the Visnes mine was used in the construction of the Statue of Liberty). Sokndal has large deposits of ilmenite.  Rogaland is the most important region for oil and gas exploration in Norway, and the Jæren district in Rogaland is one of the country's most important agricultural districts.

History 
There are remains in Rogaland from the earliest times, such as the excavations in a cave at Viste in Randaberg (Svarthola). These include the find of a skeleton of a boy from the Stone Age. Various archeological finds stem from the following times, the Bronze Age and the Iron Age. Many crosses in Irish style have been found. Rogaland was called Rygjafylke in the Viking Age. Before Harald Fairhair and the Battle of Hafrsfjord, it was a petty kingdom. The Rugians were a tribe possibly connected with Rogaland.

Culture and tourism 
A series of festivals and congresses of international fame and profile are arranged, such as The Chamber Music Festival, The Maijazz Festival, The Gladmat (lit. food with a happy smile) Festival, and The ONS event, which has been held in Stavanger every second year since 1974. The ONS is a major international conference and exhibition with focus on oil and gas, and other topics from the petroleum industry. The Concert Hall and Music Complex at Bjergsted and the Stavanger Symphony Orchestra provide important inspiration in the Norwegian musical environment. Another annual event in Stavanger is The World Tour Beach Volleyball. During this tournament, the downtown is converted into a beach volleyball arena.

Rogaland is home to many natural wonders, like Prekestolen, Kjerag and Gloppedalsura. In Stavanger, there is an archeological museum with many artifacts from early history in Rogaland. An Iron Age farm at Ullandhaug in Stavanger is reconstructed on the original farm site dating back to 350–500 AD. The Viking Farm is a museum at Karmøy.

Government 

A county (fylke) is the chief local administrative area in Norway. The whole country is divided into 11 counties. A county is also an election area, with popular votes taking place every 4 years. In Rogaland, the government of the county is the Rogaland County Municipality.  It includes 47 members who are elected to form a county council (Fylkesting). Heading the Fylkesting is the county mayor (fylkesordførar). Since 2020, the Rogaland County Municipality has been led by Marianne Chesak, the county mayor.

The county also has a County Governor (fylkesmann) who is the representative of the King and Government of Norway. Bent Høie is the incumbent governor, in office since 1 November 2021. 

The municipalities in Rogaland are divided among several district courts (tingrett): Dalane District Court, Haugaland District Court, Jæren District Court, and Stavanger District Court. All of these courts are subordinate to the Gulating Court of Appeal district based in Bergen.

Subdivisions

Municipalities

Rogaland County has a total of 23 municipalities:

Districts

 Boknafjord
 Dalane
 Haugaland
 Jæren
 Ryfylke

Cities

 Bryne
 Egersund
 Haugesund
 Jørpeland
 Kopervik
 Sauda
 Sandnes
 Skudeneshavn
 Stavanger
 Tananger
 Åkrehamn

Parishes

 Askøy (Askø)
 Avaldsnes
 Bjerkreim
 Bokn (Bukken)
 Bore
 Bø
 Domkirken, Stavanger
 Egersund
 Erfjord
 Falnes
 Ferkingstad
 Finnøy (Hesby)
 Fister
 Forsand (Fossan)
 Frue, see Hetland
 Førdesfjorden
 Gjestal
 Haugesund
 Hausken
 Helleland
 Hesby
 Heskestad
 Hetland
 Hjelmeland
 Hvidingsø
 Høgsfjord
 Høle
 Høyland
 Hå
 Håland
 Imsland
 Jelsa (Jelsø)
 Klepp
 Kopervik
 Kvitsøy (Hvidingsø)
 Lund
 Lye
 Madla
 Malle, see Madla
 Mosterøy
 Nedstrand (Hinderå)
 Norheim
 Nærbø
 Nærem
 Ogna
 Orre
 Randaberg (Randeberg)
 Rennesøy
 Riska (Riskekvernen)
 Røldal (in Hordaland after 1848)
 Sand
 Sandeid
 Sandnes
 Sankt Johannes, Stavanger
 Sankt Petri, Stavanger
 Saude (Sauda)
 Sjernarøy
 Skjold
 Skudenes
 Skudeneshavn
 Skåre
 Sokndal
 Sola (Sole)
 Soma
 Stavanger
 Strand
 Suldal
 Sørbø
 Talgøy (Talgje)
 Tananger
 Time (Lye)
 Tjora
 Torvastad (Torvestad)
 Tysvær
 Utsira
 Utstein Kloster
 Varhaug
 Vats
 Vedavågen
 Vikedal
 Vår Frue, see Hetland
 Åkra
 Åkra (old)
 Åna-Sira
 Årdal
 Egersund Branch (LDS, 1899–1913)
 Haugesund Branch (LDS, 1905–1950)
 Stavanger Branch (LDS, 1850–1938)
 Stavanger (Dissentermenigheter: Stavanger, Klepp, and Haugesund 1859–1903)
 Stavanger (Vennenes Samfund- Quakers, 1821–1951)

Villages

 Aksdal
 Amdal
 Askje
 Åkrehamn
 Åmøy
 Avaldsnes
 Bjerkreim
 Bjoa
 Bore
 Bru
 Brusand
 Dirdal
 Dueland
 Eik
 Eike
 Erfjord
 Ferkingstad
 Feøy
 Figgjo
 Fiskå
 Fister
 Fogn
 Forsand
 Foss-Eikeland
 Frafjord
 Føresvik
 Førre
 Gjesdal
 Gilja
 Grinde
 Grødem
 Hauge i Dalane
 Hellandsbygd
 Helleland
 Hellvik
 Hervik
 Hesby
 Heskestad
 Hestnes
 Hindaråvåg
 Hjelmelandsvågen
 Hommersåk
 Hundvåg
 Hæen
 Høle
 Hålandsmarka
 Hålandsosen
 Idse
 Imslandsjøen
 Innbjoa
 Jelsa
 Judaberg
 Jøsenfjorden
 Klepp stasjon
 Kleppe
 Krossberg
 Kvernaland
 Li
 Lyefjell
 Lysebotn
 Marvik
 Moi
 Mossige
 Nedstrand
 Nesflaten
 Norheim
 Nærbø
 Oanes
 Obrestad
 Ogna
 Oltedal
 Orre
 Pollestad
 Randaberg
 Rekefjord
 Røvær
 Sand i Ryfylke
 Sandeid
 Sandve
 Saudasjøen
 Sirevåg
 Sjernarøyane
 Skjold
 Skjoldastraumen
 Sogndalsstrand
 Solakrossen
 Stenebyen
 Stronda
 Suldalsosen
 Susort
 Sviland
 Sør-Hidle
 Sørbø
 Sørnes
 Talgje
 Tau
 Torvastad
 Tysværvåg
 Undheim
 Varhaug
 Vassøy
 Vatne i Sandnes
 Vatne i Vindafjord
 Veavågen
 Verdalen
 Vigrestad
 Vikebygd
 Vikedal
 Vikeså
 Vikevåg
 Visnes
 Voll
 Vormedal
 Yrke
 Ydstebøhamn
 Ølensjøen
 Ølensvåg (Ølsvågen)
 Øvrebygd
 Ålgård
 Åna-Sira
 Årdal i Ryfylke

Former municipalities

 Avaldsnes
 Egersund
 Erfjord
 Finnøy
 Fister
 Forsand
 Helleland
 Heskestad
 Hetland
 Hjelmeland og Fister
 Høle
 Høyland
 Håland
 Imsland
 Jelsa
 Kopervik
 Madla
 Nedstrand
 Nærbø
 Ogna
 Rennesøy
 Sand
 Sandeid
 Sjernarøy
 Skjold
 Skudenes
 Skudeneshavn
 Skåre
 Sogndal
 Stangaland
 Torvastad
 Vats
 Varhaug
 Vikedal
 Ølen
 Åkra
 Årdal

Education 

Øksnevad Secondary School

Demographics 

Total population:

In popular culture 
Rogaland is a playable region within Norway in Assassin's Creed Valhalla, called Rygjafylke in the game. It is also the homeland of the game’s main character, Eivor Varinsdottir.

References

External links 

 Official county website
 Region Stavanger Official tourism site for the Stavanger region

 
Counties of Norway
Petty kingdoms of Norway
1662 establishments in Norway